The Al-Azhar Shia Fatwa, known in Arabic as The Shaltoot Fatwa, is an Islamic fatwa issued in 1959 on the topic of Shi'a–Sunni relations by Sunni scholar Shaikh Mahmood Shaltoot. Under Shaltut, Sunni-Shia ecumenical activities would reach their zenith.

The fatwa is the fruit of a decade-long collaborative effort between a group of Sunni and Shia scholars at the Dar al-Taqreeb al-Madhahib al-Islamiyyah ("center for bringing together the various Islamic schools of thought") theological center at Al-Azhar University in Cairo. The aim of the effort is to bridge the gap between the various Islamic schools of thought, and to foster mutual respect, understanding and appreciation of each school's contributions to the development of Islamic jurisprudence. However, despite the ecumenical fatwa, while Shaltoot was Grand Imam of Al-Azhar he refused to establish an independent Shia chair at the University, which was one of the greatest aspirations, especially, of the Shia members of the Dar al-Taqreeb.

This rare fatwa, which admits Shias, Alawites, and Druze, who had been considered heretics and idolaters for hundreds of years, into mainstream Islam has been viewed as being inspired by  Egyptian president Gamal Abdel Nasser. Nasser saw it as a tool to spread his appeal and influence across the entire Arab world.

In 2012, due to drift towards Islamism in Al-Azhar, and the rise of the Muslim Brotherhood into leadership, the dean of the Faculty of Islamic Studies at Al-Azhar issued a fatwa strongly opposed to the 1959 fatwa. It forbade worship according to the Shia tradition and condemned as heretics anyone who insulted the wives or companions of the Islamic prophet Muhammad. Al-Azhar also published a book condemning the Shia. However after the 2013 Egyptian coup d'état, Shaykh Ahmed el-Tayeb of Jamia Al'Azhar again reiterated Shaikh Shaltoot's position in an interview

See also
Sunni fatwas on Shias
Fatwa of Ali Khamenei against insulting revered Sunni figures

References

External links
Copy of exchanges between the Sunni scholarship and the Shia scholarship
The Origins of the Sunni/Shia Split in Islam

Shia Fatwa
Fatwas
Shia–Sunni relations
1959 documents
History of the Alawites
History of the Druze